The 1968 Southern Illinois Salukis baseball team represented the University of Southern Illinois in the 1968 NCAA University Division baseball season. The Salukis played their home games at Abe Martin Field. The team was coached by Joe Lutz in his 3rd season at Southern Illinois.

The Salukis lost the College World Series, defeated by the USC Trojans in the championship game.

Roster

Schedule and results

Schedule Source:

Awards and honors 
Barry O’Sullivan
All Tournament Team

Jerry Bond
All Tournament Team

Mike Rogodzinski
All Tournament Team

References

Southern Illinois Salukis baseball seasons
Southern Illinois Salukis baseball
College World Series seasons
Southern Illinois